Johann Friedrich Gmelin (8 August 1748 – 1 November 1804) was a German naturalist, chemist, botanist, entomologist, herpetologist, and malacologist.

Education 
Johann Friedrich Gmelin was born as the eldest son of Philipp Friedrich Gmelin in 1748 in Tübingen. He studied medicine under his father at University of Tübingen and graduated with a Master's degree in 1768, with a thesis entitled: , defended under the presidency of Ferdinand Christoph Oetinger, whom he thanks with the words .

Career
In 1769, Gmelin became an adjunct professor of medicine at University of Tübingen. In 1773, he became professor of philosophy and adjunct professor of medicine at University of Göttingen. He was promoted to full professor of medicine and professor of chemistry, botany, and mineralogy in 1778. He died in 1804 in Göttingen.

Johann Friedrich Gmelin when young became an "apostle" of Carl Linnaeus, probably when Linnaeus was working in the Netherlands, and undertook a plant-collecting expedition to "Persia" on his behalf. Later in life he   published several textbooks in the fields of chemistry, pharmaceutical science, mineralogy, and botany. He also edited and published the posthumous 13th edition of Systema Naturae by Carl Linnaeus from 1788 to 1793. This contained descriptions and scientific names of many new species, including birds that had earlier been catalogued without a scientific name by John Latham in his A General Synopsis of Birds. Gmelin's publication is cited as the authority for over 290 bird species and also a number of butterfly species.

Legacy 
Among his students were Georg Friedrich Hildebrandt, Carl Friedrich Kielmeyer, Friedrich Stromeyer, and Wilhelm August Lampadius. He was the father of Leopold Gmelin. 

He described the redfin pickerel in 1789. In the scientific field of herpetology, he described many new species of amphibians and reptiles. In the field of malacology, he described and named many species of gastropods.

The plant genus Gmelina was named after Gmelin by Linnaeus.

 The abbreviation "Gmel." is also found.

Publications
 
 , 2 Vol., 1776/77 Digital edition of the University and State Library Düsseldorf.
 , 1777
 . Nürnberg: Raspe, 1777. Digital edition of the University and State Library Düsseldorf.
 . Nürnberg: Raspe, 1780. Digital edition of the University and State Library Düsseldorf.
 . Nürnberg: Raspe, 1781. Digital edition of the University and State Library Düsseldorf.
 , 1783
 , 1784
 , 1786
  , Lipsiae [Leipzig], Georg Emanuel Beer, 1788–1793
 , 1792
 , Ps. 2, T. 1 – Ps. 2, T. 2., 1795–1796. Digital edition of the University and State Library Düsseldorf. 
 , 1799
 , 1806

See also
:Category:Taxa named by Johann Friedrich Gmelin

References

 Vane-Wright, R. I., 1975. The butterflies named by J. F. Gmelin (Lepidoptera: Rhopalocera).Bulletin of the British Museum (Natural History),Entomology, 32: 17–64.pdf

External links

 Gmelin's chemical genealogy
 
 
 Global Ant Project — World Ant Taxonomists: Johann Friedrich Gmelin (1748–1804)
 
 books by Johann Friedrich Gmelin at Internet Archive
Zoologica Göttingen State and University Library

18th-century German botanists
German taxonomists
1748 births
1804 deaths
German entomologists
German mycologists
German naturalists
German ornithologists
Bryologists
Conchologists
Phycologists
Pteridologists
Teuthologists
Botanists with author abbreviations
18th-century German zoologists
19th-century German zoologists
Scientists from Tübingen